Stéphane Houdet and Nicolas Peifer won the first Wheelchair Doubles title at the Queen's Club Championships in a round robin.

Draw

Round robin

References

Doubles Draw

Wheelchair Doubles
Queen's Club Championships